Bernard Brooke (born 3 March 1930)) is an English former first-class cricketer, who played two matches for Yorkshire in 1950, against the Marylebone Cricket Club (MCC) and Oxford University.  A right arm medium fast bowler, he took two wickets at 95.5, and scored 16 runs, with a best of 14, at an average of 4.00.

He played for Yorkshire Second XI from 1948 to 1953.

References

External links

Yorkshire cricketers
Cricketers from Huddersfield
1930 births
Living people
English cricketers